Gaille Heidemann is an American voice actress, singer and songwriter.

She is known as the voice of Myriam the Mystic in Diablo III, Tempestra in Teenage Mutant Ninja Turtles, and has had guest starring roles in World of Warcraft (Warlords of Dreanor, Legion, Battle for Azeroth), Kung Fu Panda: Legends of Awesomeness, James Bond Jr., All Grown Up, Primetime Glick, The California Raisin Show, and Return to Castle Wolfenstein, among many others.

As a teenager she became a studio session singer, appearing on television and film soundtracks with The Jimmy Joyce Singers. She dubbed the singing voice for Patty Duke in Valley of the Dolls, and played the girl singer with co-stars Kim Milford and the rock band Moon in ABC's The Wide World of Mystery, produced by Don Kirshner. Her song "Hollywood Movie Girls" was recorded by Dusty Springfield and became the title and theme for the TV special Ann-Margret: Hollywood Movie Girls, for which she also wrote special material.

Heidemann's rock and roll impressions were featured on stage and film in Stars on 45 in Concert; Dream Street in Las Vegas, which won the Eppie Award for Best Show of the Year; and Forbidden Broadway in San Francisco. The Olsen twins performed nine of her songs in their musical party series, You're Invited To Mary-Kate and Ashley's Camp Out Party ("Raptor") and Ballet Party, including "Dancing Your Dreams", "Practice, Practice, Practice" and "Moonbounce Madness", all co-written with Adam Fields. She wrote, sang, produced and appears in "Obama Girl's Mama", the YouTube parody of the Obama Girl election videos directed by John Moffitt. Heidemann has voiced over a hundred commercials, including national campaigns for clients such as McDonald's, Coca-Cola, Toyota, and Goodyear Tires. Her interview is featured in Bill Filipiak's Voice Over Etiquette.

She co-wrote and produced Chuck & Di – the Tabloid Musical! for a standing-room-only run at the Long Beach Playhouse.

Filmography

References

External links

Living people
American voice actresses
Year of birth missing (living people)
21st-century American women